Charles Edward Drake III (September 5, 1981 – July 6, 2012) was an American football player who was picked in the 7th round of the 2003 NFL draft and played briefly in the National Football League. Drake also played professionally in the Austrian Football League and NFL Europe.

A native of Los Angeles, Drake played high school football at Westchester High School, where he was selected as an all-city running back.

Drake committed to play college football at the University of Michigan as part of the incoming class of 1999.  He played at Michigan from 1999 to 2002.  He was converted to a defensive back as a sophomore in 2000.  He was the starting safety in nine games for the 2001 Michigan team and a starter at cornerback in 13 games for the 2002 team.

After his senior year at Michigan, Drake was selected to participate in the 2003 NFL Combine.

Professional

He was drafted by the New York Giants in the 7th round of the 2003 NFL Draft but was released by the Giants in late August 2003, prior to the start of the regular season.  He was signed the Detroit Lions in December 2003 as a member of the team's practice squad. He remained with the team through the 2004 exhibition season.  He was released by the Lions during the first week of September 2004.  That fall, he played at the safety position for the Rhein Fire of the NFL Europe.  He also played for the Frankfurt Galaxy of the NFL Europe and the Cineplexx Blue Devils of the Austrian Football League.

Drake died in July 2012 at age 30. He had a son, Charles Drake IV, and a daughter named Milaan Drake.

References

External links
NFL Draft Profile

1981 births
2012 deaths
Players of American football from Los Angeles
American football safeties
Michigan Wolverines football players
American expatriate players of American football
American expatriate sportspeople in Austria